Bay High School is a public secondary school in downtown Panama City, Florida, U.S. As one of the oldest continuously accredited public high schools in Florida, the school serves around 1,500 students in grades 9 to 12 in the Bay District Schools.

Bay High School has a faculty of 80.

Bay High School draws the majority of students that live in the Panama City area as well as neighboring communities such as St. Andrews, Glenwood, The Cove, Millville, Pretty Bayou, and Kings Point.

History

Bay High School was established in 1924 in Panama City, Florida. It opened doors on September 13, 1926 as Bay County High School. Its building contained one office, twelve classrooms, and an auditorium during its opening. The school's yearbook theme has been The Pelican since its inception.

In 1945, they established the Tommy Oliver Memorial Stadium, in honor of the namesake of a football player. The stadium was renovated in March 2018 and the school constructed the Joe and Jeanette Chapman Field, named after the namesake of the philanthropists.

In 1976, demolition was underway on the original Bay High building, allowing for more updated facilities while being able to accommodate more students. By 1977, a new building (now called Building 1) housed the school's offices, as well as two hallways of classrooms.

More additions occurred in 2000, with the construction of a new library building and cafeteria. After the new cafeteria was opened to students in 2001, the original building was used for storage, and on occasion, wrestling practice, until its demolition in early 2018. Additional buildings deemed outdated that had had plans drawn up for their replacement were also razed in early 2018.

In 2016, the Washington Post named Bay High School as among of the challenging high schools in the United States.

Hurricane Michael
Bay High School suffered extensive damage from the landfall of Category 5 Hurricane Michael on October 10, 2018. Since then more than 60% students and faculty are in temporary modular classrooms. Renovations are being made to the school in 2019, which will feature a brand new library, a state of the art STEM facility, and a new Fine Arts center. As the 2019-2020 school year began the first renovations were made to the Cafeteria with being new flooring installed. The next phase included reopening of the Media Center and the Band and Choir room which also were updated and back in use shortly after in early 2020 all classrooms on campus with the exception of the Fine Arts classes are back in use. During the 2020-2021 school year as the STEM building nears completion the entire STEM department are being housed in the temporary modular classrooms from Hurricane Michael as demolition of Buildings 2-5 took place to make way for construction of the new state of art Barbara W. Nelson Fine Arts Center facing Harrison Ave.

While temporarily residing in their neighboring Jinks Middle School, whose building was also severely damaged, they partnered with the middle school to host a Thanksgiving community feast, which was featured in ABC's Good Morning America on November 21, 2018.

In April 2019, the school's students participated at a rally at the Florida State Capitol in Tallahassee to demand the legislative for relief funding of the school and its district.

The school received criticism in September 2019 when a video circulated on Facebook, depicting unflushed toilets, stalls with no toilet papers and broken sinks.

School uniforms
Students at the school are required to wear school uniforms. They must wear solid red, white, or black shirts or a school approved spirit T-shirt, as well as closed-toe shoes and a belt. They may wear blue jeans, khakis, and skirts. Exceptions are made on fundraiser days. After Hurricane Michael, however, the remainder of the 2018–19 school year continued without a dress code policy.

Million Dollar Band

In November 2018, after Hurricane Michael struck Panama City, the Million Dollar Band received a hurricane relief fund from Bands of 30A with a check worth US$10,000 to compensate their losses of instruments

Notable alumni

 Janarius Robinson- NFL football player Minnesota Vikings

 Richard Cheek - NFL football player
 James Finch - then-owner of NASCAR team Phoenix Racing
 Eric Kelly - NFL football player
 Tom Martin - MLB player
 Anwar Stewart - CFL football player and Hall of Famer. 
 Khyri Thornton - NFL football player
 Jay Trumbull - American politician and member of the Florida House of Representatives (6th district)
 Jeremiah Warren - NFL football player

References

External links
 

Buildings and structures in Panama City, Florida
High schools in Bay County, Florida
Public high schools in Florida